Michael Berlyn (born 1949) is an American video game designer and writer. He is best known as an implementer at Infocom, part of the text adventure game design team.

Brainwave Creations was a small game programming company started by Michael Berlyn. The company was founded in the mid-1980s, and is probably best known for co-creating Tass Times in Tonetown along with Interplay's Rebecca Heineman.

Berlyn joined Marc Blank in founding the game company Eidetic, which later became Bend Studio. In the midst of working on the company's second game, Syphon Filter, Berlyn left the video game industry. He later explained, "I did not like what the game business had become, the people who were driving it, or the nature of the product. I left before it was done and said, 'Do not put my name on the product.' I walked away from my own company. When you tell me you want to put a monk or a nun in my game and have them standing there holding guns so I can justify having the players shoot them, I think that crosses the boundaries of good taste. It doesn't offend ME, but it's got to be in bad taste, and you have to know that." 

In 1998, Berlyn started Cascade Mountain Publishing, whose goals were to publish ebooks and interactive fiction. Cascade Mountain Publishing went out of business in 2000. After this business venture collapsed, Berlyn returned to the video game industry, with a focus on casual games.

Berlyn created a "light-jazz" band called Hot Mustard, made up entirely of his own music and performances.

Berlyn was diagnosed with cancer in September 2014, after which he underwent chemotherapy and radiation treatment until at least mid-2015.

Games

 Oo-Topos, 1981, Sentient Software and Polarware/Penguin Software
 Cyborg, 1981, Sentient Software
 Gold Rush, 1982, Sentient Software
 Congo, 1982, Sentient Software
 Suspended, 1983, Infocom
 Infidel, 1983, Infocom
 Cutthroats, 1984, Infocom
 Fooblitzky, 1985, co-designer, Infocom
 Tass Times in Tonetown, 1986, Activision
 Dr. Dumont's Wild P.A.R.T.I., 1988, First Row Software Publishing
 Keef the Thief, 1989, Electronic Arts
 Altered Destiny, 1990, Accolade
 Les Manley in: Search for the King, 1990, Accolade
 Snoopy's Game Club, 1992, Accolade (with former Intellivision programmer Gene Smith)
 Bubsy in Claws Encounters of the Furred Kind, 1993, Accolade
 Bubsy 3D, 1996, Accolade
 Zork: The Undiscovered Underground, 1997, Activision (with Marc Blank)
 Dr. Dumont's Wild P.A.R.T.I., 1999, Cascade Mountain Publishing
 Syphon Filter, 1999, contributor, producer, 989 Studios
 Zen Ball, Quick Click Software
 The Art of Murder (with Muffy Berlyn), iOS, Windows, OS X, Flexible Tales
 Grok the Monkey (aka Carnival of Death) (with Muffy Berlyn), iOS, Windows, Flexible Tales
 A Taste for Murder (with Muffy Berlyn), iOS, Windows, Flexible Tales
 Reconstructing Remy (an interactive novel with Muffy Berlyn), iOS, Windows, Flexible Tales
 Ogg!, iOS, OS X, Flexible Tales

Novels
 The Integrated Man, Bantam Books, (1980) 
 Crystal Phoenix, Bantam Books, (1980) 
 Blight as Mark Sonders, Ace Books, (1981) 
 Eternal Enemy, Wm. Morrow, (1990)

References

External links

Interview with Mike Berlyn
Hot Mustard (virtual jazz band by Berlyn)
Keeping Warm - A Berlyn Jazz creation (as Hot Mustard)

1949 births
American video game designers
Infocom
Interactive fiction writers
Living people